Nawoja is the Polish feminine name   derived from the masculine name . A better known is its diminutive form Nawojka (pronounced: . 

Notable persons with the name include:
Olga Nawoja Tokarczuk, Polish writer and activist
Nawojka, a semi-legendary medieval Polish woman known to have dressed as a boy in order to study at the University of Kraków in the 14th or 15th century
 The owner of a 15th century libellus precum (manuscript prayer book) known as 
Nawojka Cieślińska-Lobkowicz, Polish art historian, director of the Museum of Art in Łódź (1996)

References

Polish feminine given names
Polish  given names